Giuseppe Lucatelli (1751-1828) was an Italian painter and architect, active in a Neoclassical style.

Biography
Born in Mogliano to a father who was a doctor, he studied in Rome, in circles dominated by Sebastiano Conca and Anton Raphael Mengs. He returned to Tolentino where he completed the decoration for the Nicola Vaccai Theater. These canvases are now collected in the Palazzo Comunale of Tolentino. They include a large canvas depicting Three Graces.  He taught design at the schools of Macerata, Tolentino and Fermo. In 1803 the French-dominated government sent him to make copies of the Correggio frescoes in the formerly cloistered Monastery of San Paolo.

He painted an altarpiece depicting a Madonna dell'Ulivo (1810) for a chapel in the Basilica of San Nicola a Tolentino.

References

1751 births
1828 deaths
18th-century Italian painters
Italian male painters
19th-century Italian painters
18th-century Italian architects
19th-century Italian architects
Italian neoclassical architects
Architects from Marche
People from Macerata
19th-century Italian male artists
18th-century Italian male artists